Crescent Methodist Episcopal Church is a historic Methodist Episcopal church located in Crescent, Saratoga County, New York.  It was built in 1852 and is a rectangular, three-by-five-bay, brick church in a vernacular Greek Revival style.  It is topped by a shallow-pitched, slate-covered, gable roof.  It features a two-stage, flat-roofed, open belfry with Tuscan order columns.  Attached is a 1-story parish hall wing.

It was listed on the National Register of Historic Places in 2000.

Due to its poor condition the church was judged unsafe, and was demolished prior to 2013.

References

Methodist churches in New York (state)
Churches on the National Register of Historic Places in New York (state)
Greek Revival church buildings in New York (state)
Churches completed in 1852
19th-century Methodist church buildings in the United States
Churches in Saratoga County, New York
National Register of Historic Places in Saratoga County, New York
1852 establishments in New York (state)